The Texas Intercollegiate Athletic Association (TIAA) was an NCAA Division III and  NAIA college athletic conference that operated from 1976 to 1996.  Its members were all located in the US state of Texas.  When the association dissolved in 1996, most of the teams joined the newly formed American Southwest Conference which included teams from other states.

Member schools

Final members

Notes

Former members

Notes

Membership timeline

Championships

Baseball
1988 Sul Ross
1989 Tarleton State
1990 Sul Ross
1991 Tarleton State
1992 Howard Payne
1993 Howard Payne
1994 Howard Payne
1995 Hardin–Simmons
1996 Sul Ross

Men's basketball
1977 Tarleton State
1978 McMurry
1979 McMurry
1980 McMurry
1981 McMurry
1982 McMurry
1983 Lubbock Christian
1984 McMurry/Tarleton State
1985 McMurry
1986 McMurry
1987 McMurry
1988 Howard Payne
1989 Tarleton State
1990 Tarleton State
1991 Tarleton State
1992 Howard Payne/Hardin–Simmons
1993 Hardin–Simmons
1994 McMurry
1995 Howard Payne
1996 Howard Payne/McMurry

Women's basketball
1977 Tarleton State
1978 Tarleton State
1979 Tarleton State
1980 Tarleton State
1981 Tarleton State
1982 Tarleton State/McMurry
1983 Tarleton State
1984 Tarleton State
1985 Tarleton State/Sul Ross
1986 Tarleton State
1987 Sul Ross
1988 Tarleton State
1989 Tarleton State
1990 Howard Payne
1991 Tarleton State
1992 Sul Ross
1993 Hardin–Simmons
1994 Hardin–Simmons/Howard Payne
1995 Hardin–Simmons/Howard Payne/Sul Ross
1996 Hardin–Simmons

Football
1976 Trinity
1977 Tarleton State
1978 Tarleton State
1979 Austin College
1980 McMurry
1981 Austin College/Sul Ross
1982 Sul Ross
1983 McMurry/Sul Ross
1984 Austin College
1985 Austin College/Sul Ross
1986 Tarleton State
1987 Tarleton State
1988 Austin College
1989 Tarleton State/Howard Payne
1990 Tarleton State
1991 Midwestern State
1992 Howard Payne
1993 Hardin–Simmons
1994 Hardin–Simmons/Midwestern State/Howard Payne
1995 Howard Payne/Hardin–Simmons

Men's golf
1977 McMurry
1978 Trinity
1979 McMurry
1980 McMurry
1981 McMurry
1982 McMurry
1983 McMurry
1984 Tarleton State
1985 Sul Ross
1986 McMurry
1987 McMurry
1988 Howard Payne
1989 Howard Payne
1990 Tarleton State
1991 Tarleton State
1992 Midwestern State
1993 Hardin–Simmons
1994 McMurry
1995 McMurry
1996 McMurry

Men's tennis
1980 Sul Ross
1981 Sul Ross
1982 Sul Ross
1983 Sul Ross
1984 Austin College
1985 Sul Ross
1986 Austin College
1987 McMurry
1988 Sul Ross
1989 Tarleton State
1990 Tarleton State
1991 Tarleton State/Howard Payne
1992 Tarleton State
1993 Hardin–Simmons
1994 Hardin–Simmons
1995 Hardin–Simmons
1996 Hardin–Simmons

Women's tennis
1980 Sul Ross
1981 Sul Ross
1982 Sul Ross
1983 Sul Ross
1984 Austin College
1985 Sul Ross
1986 Austin College
1987 McMurry
1988 Sul Ross
1989 Tarleton State
1990 Tarleton State
1991 Tarleton State/Howard Payne
1992 Sul Ross
1993 Hardin–Simmons
1994 Hardin–Simmons
1995 Hardin–Simmons
1996 Howard Payne

Men's track & field
1977 Tarleton State
1978 Tarleton State
1979 Tarleton State
1980 Tarleton State
1981 Tarleton State
1982 Tarleton State
1983 Tarleton State
1984 McMurry
1985 McMurry
1986 Tarleton State
1987 Tarleton State
1988 Tarleton State
1989 Tarleton State
1990 Tarleton State
1991 Tarleton State
1992 Howard Payne
1993 Howard Payne
1994 Howard Payne
1995 Howard Payne
1996 Howard Payne

Women's track & field
1977 Tarleton State
1978 Tarleton State
1979 Tarleton State
1980 Sul Ross
1981 Tarleton State
1982 Tarleton State
1983 Tarleton State
1984 Tarleton State
1985 Tarleton State
1986 Tarleton State
1987 Tarleton State
1988 Tarleton State
1989 Tarleton State
1990 Tarleton State
1991 Tarleton State
1992 Howard Payne
1993 Howard Payne
1994 Howard Payne
1995 Howard Payne
1996 Howard Payne

Volleyball
1976 Sul Ross
1977 Sul Ross
1978 Tarleton State
1979 Sul Ross
1980 Sul Ross
1981 Sul Ross
1982 Sul Ross
1983 Tarleton State
1984 Sul Ross
1985 Sul Ross
1986 Sul Ross
1987 Howard Payne
1988 Tarleton State/Howard Payne
1989 Howard Payne
1990 Howard Payne
1991 Sul Ross
1992 Howard Payne
1993 Midwestern State
1994 Howard Payne
1995 Howard Payne

See also
 Lone Star Conference
 American Southwest Conference

References

 
Sports in Texas
Sports organizations established in 1976
Organizations disestablished in 1996